Creag Little (born 16 April 1993, in Greenock) is a Scottish professional footballer who plays as a defender for Darvel.

He began his senior career with Greenock Morton, after coming through the youth system of rivals St Mirren. He has also played for Largs Thistle and Queen's Park.

Club career
Little started his career with St Mirren before transferring to Greenock Morton in the June 2011.

He made his first team début from the substitutes bench in a 5–0 win over Forfar Athletic in the second round of the Challenge Cup in August 2011, replacing Stuart McCaffrey after 77 minutes.

In March 2012, Little was loaned to Largs Thistle. He made his début in a home 1–1 draw with Petershill.

He was released by Morton in May 2012. After this he made his loan spell to Largs Thistle permanent. He was sent off in his first league game of his second spell at the club, in a 1–1 draw with Kilsyth Rangers.

In 2019, Little returned to senior football signing for Glasgow side Queen's Park.

On 1 July 2020, Little signed for Scottish League Two side Stenhousemuir.

Little then signed a two-year contract with Elgin City on 14 May 2021. On 12 October 2021, Little joined West of Scotland Football League side Darvel on loan until January 2022. On 11 January 2022, Little signed for Darvel on a permanent basis.

International career

Little represented Scotland at under-17 level, whilst on the books of St Mirren.

References

External links

See also
Greenock Morton F.C. season 2011-12

St Mirren F.C. players
Living people
Greenock Morton F.C. players
1993 births
Association football defenders
Footballers from Greenock
Scottish footballers
Scottish Football League players
Scottish Junior Football Association players
Largs Thistle F.C. players
Queen's Park F.C. players
Elgin City F.C. players
Darvel F.C. players
Scottish Professional Football League players
Stenhousemuir F.C. players
People educated at Largs Academy
West of Scotland Football League players
Scotland youth international footballers